Supriya Joshi is an Indian playback singer. She has over 300 songs and has more than 1000 live shows in India and abroad She was a participant in the national singing competition Sa Re Ga Ma Pa.

Career
She started her professional journey in 2005  and was a finalist in the 2005 Sa Re Ga Ma Pa reality competition show.

She is also on the panel of All India Radio as a Ghazal Singer.

As a playback singer, Supriya has lent her voice to many Bollywood films and television serials including Satya 2, Salim, Sharma ji ki Lag Gayi,
Pichaikaran, Bichagadu, Annadurai, Velayudham, Vivah, Bal Ganesha 2, Devo Ke Dev Mahadev, Balika Vadhu, Navya, Maharana Pratap, Buddha.

She has earned her doctorate (Ph.D.) in music.

Discography

Hindi and Regional

Punjabi Songs

Unplugged Songs

Television Serials

References

Sa Re Ga Ma Pa participants
1988 births
Living people